Robert Bruce Lindsay (1 January 1900 – 2 March 1985) was an American physicist and physics professor, known for his prolific authorship of physics books in acoustics, and historical and philosophical analyses of physics.

Biography
R(obert) Bruce Lindsay's January 1, 1900, birth date hailed a new century. At the age of 20, he received both a BA and an MS in physics from Brown University. Before receiving his Ph.D. for atomic models of alkali metals from Massachusetts Institute of Technology in 1924, he spent the 1922–23 academic year as a Fellow of The American-Scandinavian Foundation at the University of Copenhagen under Niels Bohr and Hans Kramers.  Lindsay and his wife Rachel translated Kramers’ book, The Atom and the Bohr Theory of its Structure, in 1923, receiving approximately $125, on which they toured Europe. Lindsay went to Yale University in 1923 as instructor in physics, and was promoted to assistant professor in 1927. He returned to Brown in 1930 as associate professor of theoretical physics, and was named Hazard Professor of Physics in 1936. He acted as chairman of the Physics Department at Brown from 1934 until he became dean of the Graduate School in 1954. Lindsay received the ASA Gold Medal in 1962, before retiring as dean of the Graduate School in 1966 and from teaching in 1970. He died March 2, 1985, in Newport, Rhode Island.

Scientific contributions
A specialist in acoustics, particularly underwater sound, Lindsay’s career began in experimental physics, but eventually focused on the creation of thought-provoking physics books and courses.  His innovative courses, such as “The Role of Science in Civilization” and “Energy and Man”, went beyond mere technical knowledge.  Most of Lindsay's books were reprinted multiple times, and many remain in print.  He is the namesake of the prestigious R. Bruce Lindsay Award, presented by the Acoustical Society of America since 1942.

References

Books
 George W. Stewart & Robert Bruce Lindsay, Acoustics: A Text on Theory and Applications, 368pp. (1930)  (ASIN B0019ADTDA). [Reprint Stewart Press (2007) ]
 Robert Bruce Lindsay, Physical Mechanics: An Intermediate Text for Students of the Physical Sciences (University Physics Series), Van Nostrand, 451pp. (1933) (ASIN B000MXV9OG, B0007GWH0S) [Reprint Van Nostrand, 480pp. (1961) ]
 Robert Bruce Lindsay & Henry Margenau, Foundations of Physics, John Wiley & Sons, 542pp. (1936)  (ASIN B000H1ITV4).  Reprint Dover Publications (1957) & Ox Bow Press (1981)
 Robert Bruce Lindsay, General Physics for Students of Science, John Wiley & Sons (1940)  (ASIN B0006AOTLU).  [Reprint Chapman & Hall (1940)  (ASIN B000OKBA82)]
 Robert Bruce Lindsay, Introduction to Physical Statistics, John Wiley & Sons, 306pp. (1941)  (ASIN B0007G0BCE). [Reprint Dover Publications (1968) ]
 Robert Bruce Lindsay, Student's Handbook of Elementary Physics, Dryden Press (1943)  (ASIN B0006AQ1XY).
 John William Strutt (Lord Rayleigh) & Robert Bruce Lindsay, Theory of Sound, 2V, Dover Publishing (1945)  (ASIN B000P7O6IK).  [Reprint Dover Publishing (1976) ]
 Robert Bruce Lindsay, Concepts and Methods of Theoretical Physics, Van Nostrand, 515pp. (1951)  (ASIN B0014KSH8C, B0000EGNM9).  [Reprint Dover Publishing  (1970) , Japanese translation (1957)]
 Robert Bruce Lindsay, Mechanical Radiation, McGraw Hill, 415pp. (1960)  (ASIN B0006AW5E8).
 Robert Bruce Lindsay, The Role of Science in Civilization, Harper & Row, 318pp. (1963). [Reprint Greenwood Publishing Group (1973)]
 Robert Bruce Lindsay, The Nature of Physics: A Physicist's Views on the History and Philosophy of his Science, Brown University Press, 212pp. (1968)  (ASIN B000NZZJ9E, B00104FWZS, B000UW0N0K).  [Reprint University Press of New England]
 Robert Bruce Lindsay, Julius Robert Mayer, Prophet of Energy (Men of Physics Series), Pergamon Press, 238pp. (1970)  (ASIN B0006C3Z6I).  [Reprint Elsevior, 244pp.]
 Robert Bruce Lindsay, Basic Concepts of Physics, Van Nostrand, 608pp. (1971) .   [Reprint Van Nostrand, 464pp.]
 Robert Bruce Lindsay, Acoustics: Historical and Philosophical Development (Benchmark Papers in Acoustics, V1), Dowden, Hutchinson & Ross, 480pp. (1973) .
 Robert Bruce Lindsay, Physical Acoustics (Benchmark Papers in Acoustics, V4), Dowden, Hutchinson & Ross, 480pp. (1974) .
 Robert Bruce Lindsay, Energy (Benchmark Papers on Energy, V1), John Wiley & Sons, 384pp. (1976) .
 Robert Bruce Lindsay, Applications of Energy: Nineteenth Century (Benchmark Papers on Energy, V2), John Wiley & Sons, 432pp. (1976) .
 Robert Bruce Lindsay, Coal (Benchmark Papers on Energy, V3), Halsted Press, 400pp. (1976) .
 Robert Bruce Lindsay, The Second Law of Thermodynamics (Benchmark Papers on Energy, V5), Halsted Press, 329pp. (1976) .
 Robert Bruce Lindsay, The Control of Energy (Benchmark Papers on Energy, V6), Halsted Press, 404pp. (1977) .
 Robert Bruce Lindsay, Early Concepts of Energy in Atomic Physics (Benchmark Papers on Energy, V7), Stroudsburg, Dowden, Hutchinson & Ross, 329pp. (1979)  (ASIN B000OUUR2M).
 Robert Bruce Lindsay, ed. Mechanical, Thermal, and Chemical Storage of Energy (Benchmark Papers on Energy), Academic Press, 379pp. (1981) .
 Robert Bruce Lindsay, ed. Electrochemical, Electrical, and Magnetic Storage of Energy (Benchmark Papers on Energy), Academic Press, 350pp. (1981) .
 Robert Bruce Lindsay, Energy in Atomic Physics, 1925-1960 (Benchmark Papers on Energy), Van Nostrand Reinhold, 381pp. (1983) .
 Robert Bruce Lindsay, Oral history interview with Robert Bruce Lindsay (May 6 & July 9, 1964).
 Robert Bruce Lindsay, Intellectual autobiography of R. Bruce Lindsay.

Scientific Papers
 R. B. Lindsay, “The Carbon Atom Model and the Structure of Diamond”, Physical Review, S2, V29, N4, pp. 497–509 (1927).
 R. B. Lindsay, “High Frequency Sound Radiation from a Diaphragm”, Physical Review, S2, V32, N3, pp. 515–519 (1928).
 R. B. Lindsay, “Note on the Theory of Acoustic Wave Filters”, Physical Review, S2, V34, N4, pp. 652–655 (1929).
 R. B. Lindsay, “Connectors in Acoustical Conduits”, Physical Review, S2, V34, N5, pp. 808–816 (1929).
 R. B. Lindsay, “A Canonical Transformation and the Vibrations of a Loaded String”, Physical Review, S2, V38, N3, pp. 491–500 (1931).
 W. S. Wilson & R. B. Lindsay, “Atomic Wave Functions for Some Excited States of Helium”, Physical Review, S2, V47, N9, pp. 681–686 (1935).
 R. B. Lindsay, “Finite Acoustic Filters”, Journal of the Acoustical Society of America, V8, N4, pp. 211–216 (1937).

1900 births
1985 deaths
People from New Bedford, Massachusetts
20th-century American physicists
Brown University alumni
University of Copenhagen alumni
Massachusetts Institute of Technology alumni
Yale University faculty
Brown University faculty
ASA Gold Medal recipients
Fellows of the American Physical Society